Pol Murd (also Romanized as Pol Mūrd) is a village in Jowzar Rural District, in the Central District of Mamasani County, Fars Province, Iran. At the 2006 census, its population was 54, in 15 families.

References 

Populated places in Mamasani County